Ivanique Kemp (Born June 11, 1991) in Nassau, Bahamas) is a Bahamian female athlete. She participated in the 2012 Summer Olympics at London for the women's 100m hurdles event. She got through to the semi-finals with a time of 13.51 seconds in heat 2. In the semis, she recorded a poorer time of 13.56 seconds and came last in the second semi final.

Personal bests

References

External links
World Athletics Bio
Athletics.net Bio

Bahamian female hurdlers
Athletes (track and field) at the 2012 Summer Olympics
Olympic athletes of the Bahamas
Living people
1991 births
People from Nassau, Bahamas
People from New Providence
Sportspeople from Nassau, Bahamas
Arkansas Razorbacks women's track and field athletes